The 2009 Cataño oil refinery fire was a fire that began with an explosion on October 23, 2009, and was extinguished on October 25 at the Caribbean Petroleum Corporation (CAPECO) oil refinery and oil depot in Bayamón, Puerto Rico. While the fire and subsequent explosion occurred close to the city of Cataño, it technically occurred within the borders of Bayamón, even though Cataño was more affected by fumes and evacuation. There were no fatalities, but 3 people were injured.

Event

The initial explosion destroyed eleven storage tanks at the facility, but quickly spread to other nearby tanks. The tanks contained gasoline, jet fuel, and diesel. The resulting explosion was measured as equivalent to a 2.8-magnitude earthquake on the Richter magnitude scale. The tanks exploded at approximately 12:23 a.m. and could be heard in places as far away as Cidra, 11 miles away and shook windows and doors over two miles away.

The explosion caused  of petroleum to be released into bodies of water and neighboring wetlands of the San Juan Bay, resulting in dead wildlife and a major health impact to the population. Environmental assessments conducted by the EPA, the US Fish and Wildlife Service (USFWS), and the Puerto Rico Department of Natural Resources (PR DNR) found dead wildlife and both aquatic and avian species, including several legally protected species, covered in oil. Millions of dollars in damage were seen by neighboring communities. After the event, about 600 people were using shelters in Cataño, Guaynabo, and Toa Baja.

The five workers that were present at the plant at the moment managed to escape in time. Several drivers were injured when the explosion shattered the glass in their cars, two people suffered minor injuries at the nearby Fort Buchanan of the U.S. Army, and four other people sought help for respiratory problems.

Initial Response

The call came to the Puerto Rico 9-1-1 office at 12:27 am. The Puerto Rico Fire Department stations of Bayamón and Cataño responded to the call once the tanks exploded. Later, due to the seriousness of the situation, PRFD had to make the decision to urgently call fire stations island-wide. Puerto Rico Police Department closed the De Diego Expressway due to the danger of the situation and a helicopter was patrolling the area. In less than one hour, firefighters from San Juan, Bayamón, Cataño, Toa Baja, Guaynabo, Carolina and Trujillo Alto responded to the urgent call. Other stations from other parts of Puerto Rico such as Ponce, Caguas, Arecibo, Humacao, and even Ft. Buchanan also responded to the scene.  One hundred and thirty firefighters, with the support of the Puerto Rico National Guard, responded to the fire. Fifteen hundred residents were evacuated from four adjacent communities. Also, San Juan, Carolina and Bayamón city fire departments and the Luis Muñoz Marín Airport Crash and Rescue responded to the call. As a result of the smoke cloud, the U.S. Federal Aviation Administration diverted plane traffic.

To avoid further explosions, firefighters attempted to chill the remaining tanks to keep them from exploding. Also, dozens of fuel trucks were being moved from the area. Due to the smoke cloud, authorities evacuated several communities downwind from it, as well as 80 people living in a secure facility for Justice Department witnesses. Governor Luis Fortuño canceled classes at nearby schools as well.

Local Response

Puerto Rico Governor Luis Fortuño declared a state of emergency, and activated the Puerto Rico National Guard to support firefighters and aid the injured. Also, schools in the San Juan Metro Area were cancelled for the day, some schools near the explosion area were closed until 4 days after the explosion due to people who were evacuated.

Governmental Aid
President Barack Obama separately declared a federal state of emergency in Puerto Rico, clearing the way for U.S. federal agencies to coordinate disaster relief and authorizing the use of federal funds. Fighting the fire has cost the local Puerto Rican government more than $6.4 million, as of October 25. The United States Army announced that the explosion and fire had closed nearby Fort Buchanan until further notice.

Authorities built a temporary pipe to San Juan Bay in order to bring seawater to extinguish the fire, but the fire was extinguished before it could be used. Fire fighting foam was supplied from the nearby United States Virgin Islands. Luis Fortuño announced on October 25 that the fire had been extinguished, and estimated the initial cost to fight the fire at $6.4 million.

Investigation
On the days after the explosion, more than 60 agents from both the FBI and the Bureau of Alcohol, Tobacco, Firearms and Explosives were dispatched to the Caribbean Petroleum Corp. in Bayamón, just west of San Juan, to aid in the investigation, said ATF spokesman Marcial Orlando Felix. Several agents flew in from the U.S. Mainland.

The Caribbean Petroleum Corporation supplies most of Puerto Rico's oil and gasoline, which is marketed under the Gulf Oil brand name, but only 10 percent is managed from this plant. Government officials said at the time that Puerto Rico had enough fuel and diesel to last for 24 days after the disaster.

The morning after the explosion, police started investigating a graffiti found near the Minillas Tunnel in San Juan with the message: "Boom, fire, RIP, Gulf." However, the FBI later determined that they were not painted by anyone connected to the explosion.

On October 30, 2009, the director of the FBI in Puerto Rico, Luis Fraticelli, said that more than 240 investigators analyzed the explosion and did not find evidence it was intentional.  Authorities continued to investigate whether negligence was involved. The next month, officials from the U.S. Chemical Safety and Hazard Investigation Board announced that a malfunctioning tank fuel gauge led to the explosion. The faulty equipment prevented workers from noticing that one of the tanks was overflowing before the fuel vapors ignited after coming into contact with electrical equipment.

Aftermath
The day after the explosion, a lawsuit was filed in the Federal District Court of San Juan against Caribbean Petroleum Corporation and MAPFRE Insurance Company. MAPFRE was later removed from the lawsuit. The action was filed by lawyers John Navares, Camilo Salas, and Daniel Becnel. On December 11, 2009, a third joint lawsuit was presented against Caribbean Petroleum Corp. by 1,000 defendants seeking $500 million in damages.

On August 2010, Caribbean Petroleum Corporation filed for bankruptcy under Chapter 11. The company cited debts of $500 million to $1 billion, against assets of $100 million to $500 million, according to the filing. The filing came after the company failed to comply with  U.S. Environmental Protection Agency orders to clean the site of the explosion. Caribbean Petroleum claimed their financial situation prevented them from doing the work, and EPA took over the cleaning process.

See also
Dupont Plaza Hotel arson
Humberto Vidal explosion
Morris J. Berman oil spill

References

External links

 Summary Report from U.S. Chemical Safety and Hazard Investigation Board (CSB)
 
Caribbean Business: Feds launch probe of fuel depot fire
CNN article on fire and possibly related "Boom, fire, RIP, Gulf, Soul, ACNF." graffiti

2009 fires in North America
2009 in Puerto Rico
2009 industrial disasters
Cataño, Puerto Rico
Explosions in Puerto Rico
Fires in Puerto Rico
History of the petroleum industry
Industrial fires and explosions
October 2009 events in North America
Petroleum in Puerto Rico